Poloni D. Avek (born 28 January 1966) is a Papua New Guinean former middle-distance runner. She competed in the women's 1500 metres at the 1988 Summer Olympics.

References

External links

1966 births
Living people
Athletes (track and field) at the 1988 Summer Olympics
Papua New Guinean female middle-distance runners
Olympic athletes of Papua New Guinea
Place of birth missing (living people)